Mukesh Persad (born 1 May 1970) is a Trinidadian cricketer. He played in forty first-class matches for Trinidad and Tobago from 1994 to 2003.

See also
 List of Trinidadian representative cricketers

References

External links
 

1970 births
Living people
Trinidad and Tobago cricketers